Charles W. L. Hill is a British-born academic. As of 2016, he is the Hughes M. and Katherine G. Blake Endowed Professor in Business Administration and Professor of Management and Organization at the University of Washington's Foster School of Business in Seattle, where he has been teaching since 1988. Previously he taught at Michigan State University (1986–88), and the University of Manchester Institute of Science and Technology (now part of the University of Manchester; 1983–86). He was also a visiting professor at Texas A&M University (1985–86). His books include Strategic Management: An Integrated Approach (2004), co-authored with G. R. Jones, and International Business: Competing in the Global Market Place (2005).

References

Living people
British business theorists
University of Washington faculty
Year of birth missing (living people)